Svampen is a water tower in Örebro. It replaced the Norra Vattentornet and Södra vattentornet in 1958. It was created by architect Sune Lindström. It is 58 meters high. To prevent suicide attempts in 2012 Örebro Municipality decided to built a net cage around the edges of the Svampen.

References

Buildings and structures in Örebro
Water towers in Sweden